Rémi Jegaan Dioh (also Rémi Diégane Dioh) is a Senegalese singer, author, composer and guitarist. He is of Serer heritage and had worked with prominent artists like Yandé Codou Sène and toured in Europe particularly in France, the UK and Spain as well as the USA with Fadiouth's choirs and the Martyrs of Uganda. He has also performed solo on the invitation of The Gambia's president Yahya Jammeh. His mother was a singer and his father was one of the most established dancers in Senegal. Most of his music is sung in Serer. He was a teacher before venturing to the music business.

In 1985, with his song "Imbokatwa Xani", a call for unity, he won first prize in the music contest of the Bureau Sénégalais du Droit d'Auteur (BSDA).

By 2 July 2009, he composed over 364 songs in Serer, Wolof and French based on the Serer Njuup music tradition (the progenitor of Mbalax). He is among the first to introduce guitar on conservative Serer folk music and at one point to the dismay of the well established Serer Diva Yandé Codou Sène who is stricter on Serer conservative tradition.

In 1984, he wrote profane, a religious cassette (2002), a religious CD and tape in (2006) and a secular CD in (March 2007).

Some tracks include
Rok Ndudaab
Te Yundox & Ma Gneuw Ba Fekala
Jokti Mbap Naa
Manga Siga
Bukar O Kor Niid
Maam Kura
Belew Kadii
HM!TOK'F A Refa
Remy Diegane chante Senghor

References

External links

 Senkto

21st-century Senegalese male singers
20th-century Senegalese male singers
Serer singers
Serer-language singers
Living people
Year of birth missing (living people)